Summer Esperanto Study (SES) is the biggest annual international event aiming to teach Esperanto. It occurs every summer since 2007, lasts for a week and attracts up to 250 participants from 30 countries, being aimed both at beginners and fluent speakers of the language. The event is organised by E@I and usually takes places in Slovakia, with the exception of 2014 when it also occurred in Russia. It has been supported several times by the Slovak ministry of education and the local mayor. In its first year, the event had a narrower focus and was called Slavic Esperanto Study.

Programme 

The main aim of SES is to teach Esperanto and three hours are spent each morning in Esperanto classes at five different levels, ranging from CEFR level A1 to C1. During the afternoon, there are lectures, workshops and games. In the evening there are concerts and a bar; artists who have performed at SES include Kim Henriksen, JoMo and La Perdita Generacio. During the week, excursions to the surrounding area also occur. The teachers include renown Esperantists such as Bertilo Wennergren and Stano Marček.

History

2014 

In 2014, SES happened twice for the first time. Both events were supported by the World Esperanto Association and the World Esperanto Youth Organization. The first and bigger event took place from July 12 to July 20 in Nitra, Slovakia and was officially supported by the Slovak minister of education, Dušan Čaplovič, the president of Nitra Region, Milan Belica, and the mayor of Nitra, Jozef Dvonč. It was attended by 248 people from 28 countries. In addition to traditional Esperanto lessons, this edition of SES included for the first time a course of Esperanto literature and culture led by writers Jorge Camacho and Nicola Ruggiero.

From August 17 to August 25, a second SES took place for the first time outside of Slovakia, in Koltyshevo, Solnechnogorsky District, Moscow Oblast. 87 people from 10 countries attended the event that was co-organized by the Moscow Esperanto Association and the Russian Esperantist Union. In addition to Esperanto lessons, it included a translation course and a Russian language course.

2015 
The tenth SES took place from August 11 to August 19 in Martin, Slovakia. It was supported by the Slovak minister of education, Juraj Draxler, the president of Žilina Region, Juraj Blanár, and the mayor of Martin, Andrej Hrnčiar.

References

External links 

 Videos of previous SES events in 2014, 2013 and 2008
 A Week In Esperanto Land (account of SES 2014 written by a participant)
  SES plena je surprizoj (article about SES 2013) in La Balta Ondo

Esperanto education
Esperanto in Slovakia
Esperanto meetings
Annual events in Slovakia